The PU-21 (Russian: ПУ-21 Пулемёт с унифицированной подачей) is a 5.45x39mm machine gun designed by V. M. Kalashnikov and M. E. Dragunov between 1972 and 1977. The PU-21 can be fed from either a 45-round magazine or a 200-round belt.

The PU-21 prototypes were thoroughly tested by the Soviet Army in Leningrad, but military experts did not see convincing arguments for replacing the RPK and RPK-74 with the PU-21 design. According to the Soviet military, the design was too complex compared to other weapons then in service, and failed to enhance combat effectiveness.

See also
RPK-74
RPL-20, a similarly belted 5.45 machine gun, drew some inspiration from this project
PKM
FN Minimi
List of Russian weaponry

References

5.45×39mm machine guns
Cold War firearms of the Soviet Union
TsNIITochMash products